was a Japanese diplomat and was the first Japanese person and Asian woman to serve as a judge on the International Criminal Court. Her work focused on human rights and gender equality. As a politician, she was the Lieutenant Governor of Saitama prefecture from 1998-2000.

Early life and education 
Saiga was born in Marugame, Kagawa, Japan on November 30, 1943. She graduated with a bachelor's degree from the Tokyo University of Foreign Studies in 1966.

Career 
Saiga entered the Ministry of Foreign Affairs immediately after graduation. Much of her early career was in Japan, culminating in 1998 when she was elected to serve as the Lieutenant Governor of Saitama prefecture. In 2000, Saiga became the Consul General at the Japanese Consulate in Seattle. She also worked as the ambassador to Norway and Iceland.

Saiga's work mainly related to human rights. In 2001, she joined the Convention on the Elimination of All Forms of Discrimination Against Women. She also advocated for Japanese citizens who were kidnapped by North Korea.

Saiga joined the International Criminal Court in January 2008. She was the first Asian woman to be elected to the court, and the first person from Japan. During her tenure on the court she oversaw the investigation of war crimes in the Democratic Republic of Congo. Though she did not have formal legal training and a limited knowledge of international law, she obtained 2/3 of the votes necessary to be elected to the position. After her sudden death in the Hague on April 24, 2009, the nomination process was changed, and an independent panel reviews all nominations before the election.

She was awarded the Order of the Sacred Treasure.

References 

2009 deaths
1943 births
People from Kagawa Prefecture
Tokyo University of Foreign Studies alumni
International Criminal Court judges
Ambassadors of Japan to Norway
Permanent Representatives of Japan to the United Nations
Japanese women ambassadors